Rao Xueman (born 11 December 1972) is a Chinese best-selling author, novelist, and short story writer. She was known for her "Teenage love themed literature". She has published more than thirty novels to date.

Biography 
Rao Xueman was born in Zigong, Sichuan in 1972. She began writing at 14 years old. In 1994, she was admitted to the Sichuan University of Science and Engineering. After graduating from university, Rao Xueman, along with Wu Meizhen and Yu Yujun, established "Flower Clothes", the first writer combination in China. Later, she became an editor and host. Now, she is a best-selling author.

Rao Xueman's first "Teenage love themed literature" novel, "The Elfin's Golden Castle" (小妖的金色城堡),  was first published in 2004.

Her fiction, The Left Ear, was made into a successful film in 2015. Secret Fruit was also adapted into a film.  A new film based on one of her novels, titled Sandglass, is scheduled for release in 2016.

References

External links

 

1972 births
Living people
Chinese bloggers
People's Republic of China essayists
Chinese women short story writers
Chinese short story writers
Short story writers from Sichuan
Writers from Zigong
Chinese women novelists
Chinese novelists
20th-century Chinese women writers
21st-century Chinese women writers
20th-century Chinese short story writers
21st-century Chinese short story writers
20th-century essayists
21st-century essayists
Chinese women bloggers
Chinese essayists
Chinese women essayists
People's Republic of China short story writers